

Synopsis
A satiric tragi-comedy about two women and their lover Robert who is an emigrant that keeps coming back. This film shows chaotic post-communist Europe after the fall of totalitarianism. Two opposite characters, women, meet during the Velvet Revolution in November 1989. Intellectual dissident Nona and a Communist secret police boss’ mistress Ester. They meet at an anti-regime demonstration and become friends. They don't want anything to do with politics, both want to get married and have kids, but also get rich. Crazy plans and risky attempts to realize their shared dreams land them in many sticky situations in the post-revolution chaos. Too much money gets in the way of the power of friendship.

Director about the film
“Before the premiere of this last film from united Czechoslovakia in June 1992, the motif of separation of Czechoslovakia was taken as a joke, but when it happened 6 months later, it was a tragedy. Even though I predicted it then, I didn’t pass as a fortune-teller. I had no idea that my main character Dáša Veškrnová would go on to become the first lady in the part of the former Czechoslovakia where I have decided to live ….”

Awards
  IX. Festival de Cinema de Troia Setubal 1993  • Grand Prize The Golden Dolphin

External links
Trailer It’s better to be wealthy and healthy than poor and ill 
Information about film

Czechoslovak comedy films
Czech comedy films
1990s Czech-language films
Slovak-language films
Films directed by Juraj Jakubisko
1992 comedy films
1992 films